Kraptor is a thrash metal band from San Cristóbal, Venezuela.

History 
Formed in 2007 in San Cristóbal by Felipe "Phill" Alvarez and Jessy Jaimes, most later, they were joined Angel Moreno and Edward Cañizares.

In 2010, Kraptor was chosen to open the festival Monsters of Rock in Maracay city, Venezuela with the Germans Tankard.

After four years of playing in the metal underground, the band signed with Mexican label Cadaver Productions, and released their debut EP Fucking Liar.

They also had the opportunity to share the stage with national and international bands such as: Violator (Brazil), Tungsteno (Argentina), Pendejo (Netherlands), Tankard (Germany), Yaotl Mictlan (United States), Intoxxxicated, Inquisidor, Brain Wash, Anabantha (Mexico), Natastor, Krueger, Blasphemy Moshpit (Venezuela), Legacy, Hedor, Patazera, Terminal War, Guerra Total, Enemy, War thrashed, Cuentos de los Hermanos Grind (Colombia) among many others bands.

In 2012, they released their first studio album, titled Night of the Living Dead, under the same label Cadaver Productions. This album contains guest vocals from Pedro Poney, of the Brazilian band Violator and Rick Rangel, of the American band Fueled by Fire.

In August 2012, they toured Mexico under the name Kraptor's Undead Chronicles Tour Mexico 2012, visiting the main cities of the country.

Later in 2012, Kraptor were chosen to be the support band for Brazil's Violator at Metal Warrior Fest VI, in Bogotá city, Colombia.

In late 2012, the record label Melomaniac Metalmedia Records gave to Kraptor the award for "Best Revelation Band" in the awards ceremony Premios Melomaniac for that year in Caracas, Venezuela.

For May 2013, the band signs also with the European label Chainsaw Distro from Greece and was announced the release of their album Night of the Living Dead on a new European version under this label.

In mid-2013, they presents a new album, a split called N.F.T.F.T. (New Forces Together For Thrash) with the thrash metal band Angry, from Brazil. This album was made in São Paulo under the label Faminttus Records.

For June 2015, Kraptor plays beside Violator from (Brazil) and Tungsteno from (Argentina) in the city of Bogota, Colombia; at the music festival BOGOTHRASH FESTIVAL OPEN AIR in their third edition, made for first time with the "open air format" to this stage.

Band members 
 Phill Alvarez – vocals, guitar
 Eddie Cañizares – guitar
 Istvan Sáenz – bass
 Leo Prato – drums

Past members 
 Leo Yañez – guitar
 Andres Calafat – bass
 Angel Moreno – guitar
 Jessy Jaimes – drums

Discography

Studio releases

References

External links 

 

Thrash metal musical groups
Venezuelan musical groups